The Dalon is a stream in the Nouvelle-Aquitaine region of France (Corrèze and Dordogne departments). It is a left tributary of the Auvézère river.

The river begins in the commune of Segonzac in Corrèze. The river empties into the Auvézère at the left bank southwest of Génis in Dordogne.

References

Rivers of France
Rivers of Dordogne
Rivers of Nouvelle-Aquitaine
Rivers of Corrèze